In geometry, the great grand stellated 120-cell or great grand stellated polydodecahedron is a regular star 4-polytope with Schläfli symbol {5/2,3,3}, one of 10 regular Schläfli-Hess 4-polytopes. It is unique among the 10 for having 600 vertices, and has the same vertex arrangement as the regular convex 120-cell.

It is one of four regular star polychora discovered by Ludwig Schläfli. It is named by John Horton Conway, extending the naming system by Arthur Cayley for the Kepler-Poinsot solids, and the only one containing all three modifiers in the name.

With its dual, it forms the compound of great grand stellated 120-cell and grand 600-cell.

Images

As a stellation 

The great grand stellated 120-cell is the final stellation of the 120-cell, and is the only Schläfli-Hess polychoron to have the 120-cell for its convex hull. In this sense it is analogous to the three-dimensional great stellated dodecahedron, which is the final stellation of the dodecahedron and the only Kepler-Poinsot polyhedron to have the dodecahedron for its convex hull. Indeed, the great grand stellated 120-cell is dual to the grand 600-cell, which could be taken as a 4D analogue of the great icosahedron, dual of the great stellated dodecahedron.

The edges of the great grand stellated 120-cell are τ6 as long as those of the 120-cell core deep inside the polychoron, and they are τ3 as long as those of the small stellated 120-cell deep within the polychoron.

See also 
 List of regular polytopes
 Convex regular 4-polytope – Set of convex regular polychora
 Kepler-Poinsot solids – regular star polyhedron
 Star polygon – regular star polygons

References 
 Edmund Hess, (1883) Einleitung in die Lehre von der Kugelteilung mit besonderer Berücksichtigung ihrer Anwendung auf die Theorie der Gleichflächigen und der gleicheckigen Polyeder .
H. S. M. Coxeter, Regular Polytopes, 3rd. ed., Dover Publications, 1973. .
 John H. Conway, Heidi Burgiel, Chaim Goodman-Strass, The Symmetries of Things 2008,  (Chapter 26, Regular Star-polytopes, pp. 404–408)

External links 
 Regular polychora 
 Discussion on names
 Reguläre Polytope
 The Regular Star Polychora
 Zome Model of the Final Stellation of the 120-cell

4-polytopes